Curt Paul Richter (February 20, 1894 – December 21, 1988) was a biologist, psychobiologist and geneticist who made important contributions in the field of circadian rhythms. Notably, Richter identified the hypothalamus as a "biological pacemaker" involved in sleeping and wakefulness. In particular, this region suspected by Richter was later identified as the suprachiasmatic nucleus.

Richter was born on February 20, 1894, in Denver, Colorado to German immigrants. His parents emigrated to the United States from Saxony, Germany. His father was an engineer who owned a steel and iron firm in Denver. In 1912, he studied engineering at the Technische Hochschule, but left after the outbreak of World War I in 1914, switching to Harvard University where he studied biology under William E. Castle. Due to his lack of experience with biology, Castle advised that he drop the course and he switched to psychology instead, studying under E. B. Holt and Robert Yerkes. He graduated from Harvard in 1917 and, after a brief tour in the United States Army, studied under John Watson at Johns Hopkins University.

Richter induced need states in experimental animals by depriving them of substances essential to survival, or manipulating the hormone levels, and showed that these need states generate appetites, and behaviors precisely fitting the animal's need even if the animal had never before experienced the need; demonstrating genetic programming of behavior. He also triggered other pre-programmed behaviors, such as nest building, by manipulating hormone levels.

Richter was elected to the United States National Academy of Sciences in 1948, the American Academy of Arts and Sciences in 1956, and the American Philosophical Society in 1959.

References

External links
Medical Archives 
 

1894 births
1988 deaths
Harvard University alumni
Johns Hopkins University alumni

Members of the American Philosophical Society